John Sandfield Macdonald,  (December 12, 1812 – June 1, 1872) was the joint premier of the Province of Canada from 1862 to 1864.  He was also the first premier of Ontario from 1867 to 1871, one of the four founding provinces created at Confederation in 1867. He served as both premier and attorney general of Ontario from July 16, 1867, to December 20, 1871.

He was referred to by his middle name, Sandfield, and often signed his correspondence and documents as J. Sandfield Macdonald.

Early life and legal career 
Born in 1812 in Glengarry County, Upper Canada, John Sandfield was the first of five children for Alexander and Nancy Macdonald, who were Roman Catholic Highland Scots. His mother died when he was eight.  Independent in mind, Macdonald twice tried to set out from home when he was eleven.

Leaving school at 16, he became a clerk at several general stores, before deciding to enter the legal profession, eventually articling under Archibald McLean. When McLean was later elevated to the Court of King's Bench for Upper Canada, Macdonald became his assistant, which allowed him to meet Allan MacNab, Thomas Talbot and William Henry Draper (with whom he would resume his articling).  Draper and McLean were leaders in the Tory political group.

Macdonald was later appointed as Queen's messenger, charged with carrying dispatches between the Lieutenant-Governor of Upper Canada and the British Minister in Washington.

In 1840, while he was on one of his missions from the Lieutenant-Governor (the Earl of Durham) to the British Minister at Washington he met Marie Christine Waggaman, daughter of George Augustus Waggaman, a former Whig senator from Louisiana. They were married in 1840 and raised three children.

Province of Canada politics 

In 1841, Macdonald was approached by two local conservative political figures, Alexander Fraser and John McGillivray, to stand for election for the Glengarry riding in the new Legislative Assembly of the Province of Canada.  With their support, he easily won election and entered Parliament, ostensibly in support of Draper.  However, Macdonald at this point did not have firm political views, and once in Parliament, he gradually shifted towards the Reform group and away from Draper. In the first session of the Parliament, he supported the union of the Province of Canada and the government of Governor General, Lord Sydenham, but for the rest of the first Parliament, he consistently voted in support of Robert Baldwin, the leader of the Reformers of Canada West.

A Reformer and advocate of responsible government, Macdonald served in all eight Assemblies of the Province of Canada prior to Confederation. He also served in several pre-confederation administrations, including a period as co-premier of the Province of Canada from 1862 to 1864. It was this time when Macdonald suffered a collapsed lung from chronic tuberculosis.

Macdonald was initially an opponent of confederation, but came to accept it and became an ally of Sir John A. Macdonald (no relation). John A. Macdonald helped manoeuvre Sandfield Macdonald into the position of first Premier of Ontario.

Premier and Attorney-General of Ontario
Macdonald was elected for the provincial riding of Cornwall in the first general election of 1867 for the new province of Ontario.  He was re-elected in the election of 1871.  In addition to serving as Premier, he also occupied the post of Attorney General of Ontario.

Macdonald instituted several notable achievements, in addition to setting up the initial machinery of government for the new Province:

 An Act modelled on the US Homestead Acts provided for virtually free land for homesteaders on surveyed crown lands of Muskoka, Haliburton and north Hastings, and further Acts encouraged the northern extension of railways into those areas.
 The District of Muskoka was created to aid in the colonization effort, from townships withdrawn from Simcoe County, Victoria County and the District of Nipissing.
 Education aid was concentrated into the University of Toronto, at the expense of the denominational colleges.
 The election laws were reformed in 1868 to establish a single date for elections to be held (as opposed to a range of dates), and to broaden the franchise.

His government was moderate and initially a coalition of liberals and conservatives (described in contemporary accounts as a "Patent Combination" government), but suffered from defections by more radical Reformers. This group joined with the Clear Grits to form the opposition Liberal Party led by Edward Blake and Oliver Mowat. In December 1871, Macdonald's government was defeated by Edward Blake's Liberals. Macdonald resigned, and died several months later.

In the early years of confederation, politicians were allowed to serve simultaneously in the House of Commons and in a provincial legislature. From 1867 to 1872, Macdonald was also a Liberal MP in the House of Commons of Canada.

Family
Macdonald's brothers, Donald Alexander Macdonald and Alexander Francis Macdonald, were also politicians, and served as federal Members of Parliament. Donald, who served as an MP the longest of the three brothers, was in the House of Commons concurrently with both Sandfield and Alexander, although Sandfield and Alexander did not serve concurrently with each other.

Legacy
Sandfield Macdonald would be the last Roman Catholic Premier of Ontario for 132 years; not until Dalton McGuinty became premier in 2003 would another Roman Catholic assume the office. After Macdonald's tenure, sectarian tensions in the province rose, and the Conservative Party increasingly became identified with the Orange Order and sectarian Protestantism. Even though most of the party's leaders were not sectarian themselves (with a few notable exceptions), Orange Ontarians became a core constituency of the party that leaders were loath to neglect. Catholics, meanwhile, increasingly voted for the Liberal Party. While the Liberals could never be called a Catholic party, the Catholic vote became as important a constituency to the Liberals as the Orange vote became to the Conservatives.

Nineteenth century religious tensions aside, Macdonald's election as Ontario's first Premier makes his Catholicity an important historic symbol. Similarly the election of John Thompson, Canada's first Roman Catholic Prime Minister only twenty five years after Confederation, was indicative of the ambitions of Roman Catholics to be full and equal participants in the newly created country.

Macdonald is buried in historic St. Andrews Cemetery in St. Andrews West, South Stormont, Ontario. The gravesite is marked by a bronze plaque, the first under an Ontario Heritage Trust program to honour Ontario premiers at their burial sites, similar to a national program to mark the graves of prime ministers.

The Macdonald Block Complex, a major set of four office towers which house ministries of the Ontario government, is named after Macdonald.

A statue of Macdonald stands in front of the east side of the Ontario Legislative Building in Toronto. The monument, unveiled in 1909, was sculpted by Walter Allward.

He was portrayed by Aidan Devine in the 2011 CBC Television film John A.: Birth of a Country.

Archives 
There is a John Sandfield Macdonald fonds at Library and Archives Canada. 
The archival reference number is R3034. There is also a John Sandfield Macdonald collection at the Archives of Ontario.

Electoral record

References

External links

 
 Ontario Plaques – John Sandfield Macdonald

1812 births
1872 deaths
Liberal Party of Canada MPs
Premiers of Ontario
Premiers of the Province of Canada
Members of the Executive Council of the Province of Canada
Members of the Legislative Assembly of the Province of Canada from Canada West
Leaders of the Progressive Conservative Party of Ontario
Members of the House of Commons of Canada from Ontario
Attorneys General of Ontario
Lawyers in Ontario
Canadian King's Counsel
People from Cornwall, Ontario
Canadian people of Scottish descent
Canadian Roman Catholics
Attorneys-General of the Province of Canada